Ray Arthur Holbert III (born September 25, 1970) is a former Major League Baseball player. He is the brother of fellow major league infielder Aaron Holbert

An infielder, Holbert played for the San Diego Padres (1994–95), Atlanta Braves (1998), Montreal Expos (1998), and Kansas City Royals (1999–2000).

External links

1970 births
Living people
African-American baseball players
American expatriate baseball players in Canada
Arizona League Padres players
Atlanta Braves players
Baseball players from Torrance, California
Gulf Coast Royals players
High Desert Mavericks players
Kansas City Royals players
Las Vegas Stars (baseball) players
Major League Baseball right fielders
Major League Baseball second basemen
Major League Baseball shortstops
Major League Baseball third basemen
Montreal Expos players
Omaha Golden Spikes players
Ottawa Lynx players
Richmond Braves players
San Diego Padres players
Toledo Mud Hens players
Tucson Toros players
Waterloo Diamonds players
Wichita Wranglers players
21st-century African-American sportspeople
20th-century African-American sportspeople